Tempo is a fictional African-American mutant character appearing in American comic books published by Marvel Comics. She was introduced as a member of the Mutant Liberation Front in New Mutants #86 (February 1990).

Publication history
Tempo first appeared in New Mutants #86.

Fictional character biography
Tempo (alter ego Heather Tucker) is a founding member of the terrorist organization known as the Mutant Liberation Front (MLF). Tempo is a mainstay in the team's adventures, including fighting Wolverine, Sunfire, X-Factor and others in the name of mutant rights, using her time-bending powers.

The MLF destroy the Tucker Clinic, an institute for pregnant mothers to undergo prenatal DNA testing to determine whether or not their babies would be mutants, resulting in the death of Dr. Tucker. The story hints that Tempo may have been his daughter.

Soon after, a tyrannical despot named Reignfire reforms the MLF and tasks them with killing Henry Peter Gyrich. Tempo intervenes to save Gyrich and is exiled from the MLF.

After leaving the MLF, Cable invites Tempo to join X-Force but she declines, choosing instead to go to college and put aside the super-powered lifestyle. She is again briefly affiliated with the MLF during Operation: Zero Tolerance. 

After M-Day, Tempo is one of the few to retain her powers. She then becomes a member of the reformed Acolytes. When they disband, she joins Utopia and works alongside the X-Men.

In Age of X, Tempo is transformed into a soldier of Fortress X. Tempo is fatally wounded while battling humans, but before she dies Legacy absorbs her memories.

Before being recruited into the Marauders, Tempo was in a relationship with another mutant, Bouncer (Renata Da Lima), but they broke up.

Powers and abilities
Tempo can manipulate time. She is able to slow or stop her opponents and speed up either herself or her teammates. She has prevented grenades from exploding by keeping them in suspended motion, and was also able to successfully attack Rogue by amplifying Rogue's speed, causing her to crash into a wall while flying.

Strain limits how long Tempo can maintain a major time manipulation. While it was never established how long that limit is, she was able to completely freeze the X-Men for several minutes while she and the Acolytes conducted a thorough search of the X-Men mansion. Tempo can also levitate herself and fly at subsonic speeds.

Besides offering her physical protection, Tempo's helmet also contains electronic equipment that provides her with resistance to Cable's telepathic probes.

References

External links
UncannyXmen.net Character Profile on Tempo

Characters created by Louise Simonson
Characters created by Rob Liefeld
Comics characters introduced in 1990
Fictional African-American people
Fictional characters who can manipulate time
Fictional lesbians
Marvel Comics female supervillains
Marvel Comics LGBT superheroes
Marvel Comics mutants